A natural state refers to 
the (speculative) pristine state of earth and its ecosystems in prehistory
the economical, social, and ecological state of things in previously so-called "primitives" or indigenous cultures

Natural State could refer to the following:

 The original name for the novel Masters of Evolution
 The state nickname for the U.S. state of Arkansas
 A state characterized by its existence as a limited access order
 State of nature